John Hall was the fifth president of New York University in New York City, serving 1881–1891.

References
 History of the Office. New York University. Accessed 2011-02-24.

Presidents of New York University
Year of death missing
Year of birth missing